There is no formal Scouting organization yet in Turkmenistan, due to the political situation and because Turkmenistan refuses to join any organization because of its "status of permanent neutrality," which was accepted by the United Nations General Assembly on December 12, 1995. The only widespread outreach activities for Turkmen children between ages 8-14 are 10 to 14 day camps that do not provide any educational components but organize some cultural events like concerts, poems and dance competitions.

With the death of Saparmurat Niyazov on December 21, 2006, the situation may change, possibly opening for the expansion of Scouting.

There are, however, two Scout troops active in the vicinity of the capital, Aşgabat and one recent attempt in Daşoguz.

As far as is known, Scouting was not introduced to the region during the khanate period of the pre-Soviet era.

The concept of Scouting is at least marginally understood in Turkmenistan, as Turkmenistan issued postage stamps for the October 7, 1997 90th anniversary of the Boy Scouts; as well as other Turkmen postage stamps with Scout motifs and showing a heavy, darkish colored fleur-de-lis.  This does not necessarily mean complete understanding, and the stamps may well simply have been produced for the sake of marketability, but it shows that the concept of Scouting exists at some level in Turkmenistan.

With the 1991 breakup of the Soviet Union, it was suggested that the Türkiye İzcilik Federasyonu assist in the creation of Scouting movements in the Turkic Central Asian republics of Kazakhstan, Kyrgyzstan, Turkmenistan and Uzbekistan, but it is uncertain if this plan ever materialized. In Iraq there is the Turkmen Federation of Scouts (Türkmen Izcilik Federasyonu) founded in 2010 and based in Kirkuk.

The Scout Motto is Daima Häzir, meaning Be Prepared in Turkmen, similar to Azeri and Turkish mottoes. The Turkmen noun for a single Scout is Skaut or İzci. Given recent flux in the Turkmen language, an entirely different name may be decided upon.

References

See also

World Organization of the Scout Movement
Organization of the Scout Movement of Kazakhstan
Scouting in Kyrgyzstan
Scout Association of Uzbekistan

Turkmenistan
Organizations based in Turkmenistan